Independent TV, formerly Reliance Big TV, was an Indian direct to home (DTH) television operator. It was a subsidiary of Reliance Communications till 2018 and later became part of Pantel Technologies & Veecon Media.

History
Independent TV originally launched as Reliance Big TV on 19 August 2008. The service acquired 1 million subscribers within 90 days of launch, due to limited competition from other operators in the market. The service was later renamed to Reliance Digital TV. The operator was acquired by Pantel Technologies & Veecon Media in January 2018.

In March 2018, the company launched a pre-booking DTH offer. The company took bookings and collected revenue from customers, but the service connections were not installed. After launching the DTH offer, the Pantel Technologies & Veecon Media group rebrand the company as Independent TV.

The company was unable to provide installation to customers and not returned money to there millions of customers which they collected without installation as prebooking offer, they since their agreement with STAR India group had expired due to nonpayment. On 23 July 2018, Telecom Disputes Settlement and Appellate Tribunal (TDSAT) requested Star India and Independent TV to enter into a fresh agreement within 4 weeks.

The company's service was disrupted after further payments to the Antrix corporation were missed. Independent TV closed its services on 12 June 2019.

Independent TV Limited is a DTH Licensee of the Ministry of Information & Broadcasting (MIB), Govt of India. This license has been renewed on 19 June 2019 for a further period of six (6) months, like for all other DTH licensees in India today, and is valid till 31 December 2019. All the conditions precedents defined by MIB, Govt of India, have already been successfully complied with, and acknowledged as of 5 July 2019. The satellite services of the DTH operator are temporarily suspended. Independent TV limited has launched a new go-to-market business drive named “ITV 2.0” for its channel partners, to resume its Business Operations again for consumer acquisition and service delivery As of January 2020, with TRAI's The Indian Telecom Services Performance Indicator Report July – September 2019, it has acknowledge that Independent TV has fully shut down operations taking the count of pay dth operators to four.

See also
 Direct-to-home television in India

References

External links 

Reliance Group
Indian direct broadcast satellite services
Television networks in India
Indian brands
2008 establishments in Maharashtra
Telecommunications companies established in 2008
Indian companies established in 2008
Indian companies disestablished in 2019
Telecommunications companies disestablished in 2019